Realm is the dominions of a king (or queen); a kingdom.

Realm may also more broadly refer to everything which falls within a certain set of parameters and may specifically refer to:

Maths and science 
 biogeographic realm, the largest scale bio-geographic division of the Earth's surface
 A hyperplane in geometry
 Domain (biology), the highest taxonomic rank of life, also called realm
 Realm (virology), the highest taxonomic rank of viruses

Religion 
Realm, an English translation for two terms in Buddhist cosmology:
Trailokya, or three realms
Six realms (gati)
 Plane (esotericism)

Information technology 
 Realm (database), an object database and platform created primarily for mobile devices maintained by Realm Inc.
 A URL pattern in OpenID protocol, for which the OpenID authentication is valid
 An ID for an instance of a server software- HTTP transmits Realm when answering to a Basic access authentication request to distinguish different areas on server
 A scope of operation in networking or in security — as in Active Directory realms

Popular culture
 Realm, an American progressive thrash metal band
 Realm (magazine), a British coffee-table magazine
Realm Media, formerly Serial Box, an American audio entertainment company
 "Realms", a song by Hawkwind from Space Bandits   
 The Realm (film), a 2018 Spanish thriller film

Games 
 Realm (World of Warcraft), a server cluster for playing World of Warcraft
 Realm (video game), a 1996 platform shooter
 Realms (video game), a 1991 real-time strategy game by Graftgold
 The Realm Online, one of the first massively multiplayer online role-playing games

Other uses
 Commonwealth realm, one of the states of the Commonwealth of Nations that recognize Queen Elizabeth II as monarch
 German Reich, or German Realm, the nation state of the German people
 The Realm (company), a surfing products and clothing company

See also
 Realmz, a 1994 fantasy adventure
 Relm (disambiguation)